James Flower or Jim Flower may refer to:

Sir James Flower, 2nd Baronet (1794–1850), British politician
Jim Flower (American football) (1895–1956), American football player
Jim Flower (Royal Navy officer) (1923–2002), British Royal Navy engineer admiral